Love 'Em and Feed 'Em is a 1927 American silent comedy film starring Max Davidson and featuring Oliver Hardy.

Cast
 Max Davidson as 'Cherokee' Cohen
 Oliver Hardy as 'Happy' Hopey
 Viola Richard as Viola, a telephone operator
 Martha Sleeper as Martha, a stenographer

See also
 List of American films of 1927
 Oliver Hardy filmography

External links

1927 films
1927 short films
American silent short films
American black-and-white films
1927 comedy films
Silent American comedy films
American comedy short films
Films directed by Clyde Bruckman
1920s American films